Christine Evans may refer to:
 Christine Evans (singer-songwriter)
 Christine Evans (poet)
 Christine Evans (children’s author)